This is a list of Notable Cheltonians, or people from Cheltenham in Gloucestershire by occupational groups, ordered alphabetically. Information not found on a person's Wikipedia page must be referenced:

Arts
Jake Chapman (born 1966), artist famous for his work with his brother Dinos Chapman, was born in Cheltenham.
P. J. Crook (born 1945), artist, was born and lives in Cheltenham.
Clarence Dobell (1836–1917), artist and illustrator, born in Cheltenham.
Clive Piercy (1955–2017), graphic designer and author, was born in Cheltenham.
Frances Emilia Crofton (1822–1910), artist, lived in Cheltenham.

Literature
Sarah Burney (1772–1844), novelist, retired to Cheltenham in 1841 and died there.
Claude Reignier Conder (1848–1910), co-authored the work Survey of Western Palestine, on behalf of the Palestine Exploration Fund
Geoff Dyer (born 1958), novelist, author and journalist, was born and raised in Cheltenham.
James Elroy Flecker (1884–1915), poet and playwright, was educated at Dean Close School.
Winifred Foley (1914–2009), chronicler of the Forest of Dean, retired to Cheltenham in 1998 and died there.
Stephen Graham (1884–1975) journalist, travel writer and author lived in Cheltenham until the age of 14.
James Payn (1830–1898), novelist and journal editor, was born in Cheltenham.
John Simpson (born 1953), lexicographer, was born in Cheltenham and attended Dean Close School.
Kate Thornton (born 1973), journalist and television presenter, was born in Cheltenham.

Military service
Duncan Gordon Boyes (1846–1869), VC, was born in Cheltenham and educated at Cheltenham College.
Henry Hadley (1863–1914), often deemed "the first British casualty of the First World War", was born in Cheltenham.
Arthur "Bomber" Harris (1892–1984), commander of Bomber Command in the Second World War, was born in Cheltenham.

Music
Michael "Würzel" Burston (1949–2011), guitarist for the heavy metal band Motörhead, was born in Cheltenham.
Jaz Coleman (born 1960), lead singer of Killing Joke, was born and raised in Cheltenham.
4ft Fingers punk rock band, was formed in Cheltenham in 1996.
Christopher Gunning (born 1944), composer, was born in Cheltenham.
Gustav Holst (1874–1934), composer, was born in Cheltenham and attended Cheltenham Grammar School.
Brian Jones (1942–1969), founder of the Rolling Stones, was born in Cheltenham.
Dame Felicity Lott (born 1947), opera and concert soprano, was born in Cheltenham.
Andrew McCrorie-Shand (born 1955), composer, was born in Cheltenham.
Richard O'Brien (born 1942), of the Rocky Horror Show, was born in Cheltenham.
FKA Twigs (born 1988), singer-songwriter and dancer, was born in Cheltenham.
Kitty Brucknell (born 1984), singer, was born in Cheltenham.
Screaming Dead (formed 1980), the band often claimed as the founders of horror punk, was formed in Cheltenham.
Inkubus Sukkubus (formed 1989), Gothic and Pagan band, was formed in Cheltenham.
Solemn Sun (formed 2009), punk band formed in Cheltenham.

Public service
Sir James Tynte Agg-Gardner (1846–1928), brewery owner, Lord of Cheltenham Manor and its Conservative Member of Parliament in 1874–1880, 1885–1895, 1900–1906 and 1911–1928
Dorothea Beale (1831–1906), headmistress of Cheltenham Ladies' College
Sir Douglas Dodds-Parker (1909–2006), Conservative MP for Cheltenham in 1964–1974 and World War II member of the Special Operations Executive 
Fred G. Hughes (1837–1911), five-times member of Arizona Territorial Legislature, was born in Cheltenham.
Charles Irving (1924–1995), Conservative MP for Cheltenham, 1974–1992
Nigel Jones, Baron Jones of Cheltenham (1948–2022), Liberal Democrat MP for Cheltenham (1992–2005)
Richard Pate or Pates (1516–1588), founder of Pate's Grammar School, was born in Cheltenham.
Sir John Wood (1870–1933) of the Indian Civil Service was born in Cheltenham.

Sciences and humanities
Jabez Allies (1787–1856), folklorist and antiquarian, retired and died in Cheltenham.
Piers Coleman (living), physicist, was raised in Cheltenham.
Dr Henry Anstey Cookson, FRSE, pathologist, lived in Cheltenham.
Napoleon Cordy (1902–1977), Mayanist scholar, was born in Cheltenham.
Robert Etheridge (1847–1920), Anglo-Australian palaeontologist and curator of the Australian Museum from 1895, was born in Cheltenham.
Dr Leopold George Hill (1866-1922), physician and medical missionary, was born and raised in Cheltenham.
John H. Mercer (1922–1987), glaciologist and geographer, was born and raised in Cheltenham.

Sports
Michael Bailey (born 1954), first-class cricketer, was born in Cheltenham.
Paul Casey (born 1977), professional golfer, was born in Cheltenham.
Sean Conway, endurance swimmer, lives in Cheltenham.
Steve Cotterill (born 1964), footballer and football manager, played for Cheltenham Town F.C. and other League teams.
Martin Devaney (born 1980), footballer with Cheltenham Town F.C. and other professional teams
Eric Dier (born 1994), footballer with Tottenham Hotspur, was born in Cheltenham.
Eddie "The Eagle" Edwards (born 1963), Olympic ski-jumper, was born in Cheltenham.
Bob Foster (1911–1982), professional motorcycle racer known as the Cheltenham Flyer, won the 1950 350cc world championship.
Matt Gotrel (born 1989), rower, gold medallist in men's eight rowing at the Summer Olympics 2016, was born and lives in Cheltenham.
Geoff Hurst, international footballer, in 1966 the only man to score a hat-trick in a World Cup Final, lives in Cheltenham.
Gilbert Jessop (1874–1955), among the fastest-scoring test cricketers, was born in Cheltenham.
Claude Myburgh (1911–1987), cricketer and soldier, was born in Cheltenham.
William Pollock (1859–1896), chess player, was born in Cheltenham.
Zac Purchase, Olympic gold-medal rower, was born in Cheltenham.
Mike Summerbee, Swindon Town, Manchester City and England footballer, was raised in Cheltenham.
Leon Taylor (born 1977), Olympic silver-medallist diver, was born and educated in Cheltenham.
Edward Adrian Wilson (1872–1912), explorer who joined Scott on his ill-fated Antarctic Expedition, was born in Cheltenham and attended Cheltenham College.
Sir John Wood (1870–1933), first-class cricketer, was born in Cheltenham.

Stage
Ernest Cossart (1876–1951), actor, was born in Cheltenham and attended Cheltenham Grammar School.
Mike Grady (born 1946), character actor, was born in Cheltenham.
Robert Hardy (1925–2017), actor, was born and raised in Cheltenham.
Damaris Hayman (1929–2021), character actress, was educated at Cheltenham Ladies' College.
Martin Jarvis (born 1941), actor, was born in Cheltenham.
Mark Lester (born 1958), who played Oliver Twist in the 1968 film Oliver!, lives in Cheltenham.
Richard Loncraine (born 1946), film and television director, was born in Cheltenham.
Arthur Negus, (1903–1985), broadcaster and antiques expert, lived and died in Cheltenham.
Josh O'Connor, (born 1990), who played Prince Charles in The Crown, was born in Cheltenham.
Ralph Richardson (1902–1983), actor, was born in Cheltenham.
Corrinne Wicks (born 1968), actress, was born and raised in Cheltenham.

Trade
Sir George Dowty (1901–1975), inventor and businessman, set up Dowty Aviation in Cheltenham.
John Nevil Maskelyne (1839–1917), magician and pay-toilet inventor, was born in Cheltenham.
Sir Frederick Handley Page (1885–1962), founder of the aircraft maker Handley Page, was born in Cheltenham and attended Cheltenham Grammar School.

See also
People from Cheltenham
List of people from Gloucestershire

References

 
Cheltonians